Yeo Woon-kon (born 4 September 1974) is a field hockey player from South Korea, who was a member of the Men's National Team that won the silver medal at the 2000 Summer Olympics in Sydney. In the final the South Koreans were beaten by the Dutch title holders after penalty strokes. Yeo also competed at the 2004, 2008 and 2012 Summer Olympics.

External links

 Profile on Athens 2004 Web Site
 dataOlympics profile

1974 births
Living people
South Korean male field hockey players
Olympic field hockey players of South Korea
Field hockey players at the 2000 Summer Olympics
Field hockey players at the 2004 Summer Olympics
Field hockey players at the 2008 Summer Olympics
Field hockey players at the 2012 Summer Olympics
Olympic silver medalists for South Korea
Olympic medalists in field hockey
1998 Men's Hockey World Cup players
2002 Men's Hockey World Cup players
2006 Men's Hockey World Cup players
Asian Games medalists in field hockey
Field hockey players at the 1998 Asian Games
Field hockey players at the 2002 Asian Games
Field hockey players at the 2006 Asian Games
Field hockey players at the 2010 Asian Games
Medalists at the 2000 Summer Olympics
Asian Games gold medalists for South Korea
Asian Games silver medalists for South Korea
Hamyang Yeo clan
Medalists at the 1998 Asian Games
Medalists at the 2002 Asian Games
Medalists at the 2006 Asian Games
South Korean Buddhists